The Heysen Tunnels are twin tube road tunnels which carry the South Eastern Freeway under Eagle On The Hill in the Mount Lofty Ranges in South Australia.

Construction 
The tunnels were completed in 1998 and opened in March 2000.

Operation 
Each tunnel carries three lanes of traffic. As at 2015, 45,700 vehicles passed through them daily. Laser height detectors monitor traffic to provide warnings to drivers before they attempt to enter the tunnel.

The tunnels are named after artist Sir Hans Heysen.

Location

See also
South Eastern Freeway § History
List of tunnels in Australia

References

Tunnels completed in 2000
Tunnels in South Australia
Road tunnels in Australia